Sasnava is a small town in Marijampolė County, in southwestern Lithuania. At the 2011 census, it had a population of 546. It is on the confluence of the  River and its tributary, the Šešupė.

References

Towns in Lithuania
Towns in Marijampolė County